is a former Japanese football player.

Club statistics

References

External links

1984 births
Living people
Association football people from Kanagawa Prefecture
Japanese footballers
J1 League players
J2 League players
Omiya Ardija players
Kashiwa Reysol players
Shonan Bellmare players
Association football midfielders